Justice Party was a political party in Iran, led  by Ali Dashti who co-founded it with other intellectuals who had participated in the politics of the early 1920s. Other prominent politicians include Jamal Emami, Ebrahim Kajanouri, Farajollah Bahrami, Jamshid Alam and Abulqassem Amini.

The party was "an association somewhat resembling a private club, with little organizational cohesion or collective sense of identity". Idologically, its character consisted of a centre-right nationalism and advocated general reforms in the administration and legal and educational systems.

The party opposed the Tudeh Party and supported a constitutional monarchy in Iran. According to Hossein Dadgar, a leading member of the party, it was formed "to counter the 'Fifty-three' communists who had founded the dangerous Tudeh party."

They backed Mohsen Sadr's government and were considered opposition to the governments of Ahmad Qavam and Ali Soheili.

References

Political parties established in 1941
1941 establishments in Iran
Political parties disestablished in 1946
1946 disestablishments in Iran
Centrist parties in Iran
Nationalist parties in Asia
Anti-communist parties
Monarchist parties in Iran